Too Close may refer to:

 "Too Close" (Next song), 1997, later covered by Blue
 "Too Close" (Alex Clare song), 2011
 "Too Close" (Wilkinson song), 2014
 "Too Close", a song by Ariana Grande from My Everything

See also